Bhittai Colony; is a neighborhood of Korangi Town in Karachi, Sindh, Pakistan. This neighborhood is named after the Sufi poet Shah Abdul Latif Bhittai.

There are several ethnic groups including Muhajirs, Punjabis, Sindhis, Kashmiris, Seraikis, Pakhtuns, Balochis, Memons, Bohras and Ismailis. Over 90% of the population is Muslim. Ahmadiyya Muslim community and Non-Muslim like Christian and Hindu communities are also residing there with brotherhood and harmony. Bhittai Colony comes under Korangi Creek Cantonment but is to some extent self-governing. Bhittai colony is subdivided into many sectors (A to H). The colony faces various problems with utilities including sewerage, water, electricity and the condition of roads. Bhittai Colony is also called Korangi Crossing. It connects with three important roads, one going to Main Saddar Bazaar, second to Korangi & Landhi and the third to PAF Base Creek.

References
A.wahab Bhittai colony ko abad karne wale Molana abul Rasheed mrhom is ki bunyad khud Molana A.Rasheed ne 1974 mai rakhi logo ko 600 rs ka 80 sy k fi pilot farokht kiya aur ap ne logo ko apni taraf se pani khared kar  free pani pilaya aur bhi welfare k kam kiye 1982 mai ap Ka intyqal howa
Me Abdul wahab in Ka beta hun
03151029410

External links
Location on Google Maps

Neighbourhoods of Karachi
Geography of Sindh
Shah Abdul Latif Bhittai